The Kara-Balta is a transboundary river in Jayyl District of Chüy Region in northern Kyrgyzstan and in Shu District of Jambyl Region in southern Kazakhstan. It rises on north slopes of Kyrgyz Ala-Too, passes through the Sosnovka Gorge, flowing through the Chüy Valley from south to north. The river discharge in Ak-Suu, itself a tributary of the Chu, in Kazakhstan. It flows through the settlements Sosnovka, Kara-Balta and Stavropolovka.

References

Rivers of Kyrgyzstan
Rivers of Kazakhstan
International rivers of Asia